Reliance is a ghost town in Brazos County, in the U.S. state of Texas. It is located within the Bryan-College Station metropolitan area.

History
Reliance was originally named Little Georgia because most of its first settlers came to the area from that state and settled here in the 1850s. Its name was changed to Reliance by David Lloyd, who moved here from Mississippi and founded the local Baptist church in 1873. A general store was owned and operated by William H. (Uncle Billy) Morgan and a post office was established here in 1899 and remained in operation until 1907. It also had a cotton gin and gristmill at one point. Reliance Cemetery's oldest grave dates back to 1881. It was last listed on the Texas Almanac in 1910 when it reported a population of only 10 and had one business. In 1948, Reliance had the church and cemetery and several scattered houses. Only the church and cemetery remained in 1986 with no further information.

Geography

Education
In the 1905-1906 school year, Reliance had a school with 91 students and two teachers, who also taught in nearby Independence. It continued to operate in 1948. Today, Reliance is located within the Bryan Independent School District.

References

Ghost towns in Texas